
This is a list of players who graduated from the Buy.com Tour in 2000. The top 15 players on the Buy.com Tour's money list in 2000 earned their PGA Tour card for 2001.

*PGA Tour rookie for 2001.
T = Tied
Green background indicates the player retained his PGA Tour card for 2002 (finished inside the top 125).
Yellow background indicates player did not retain his PGA Tour card for 2002, but retained conditional status (finished between 126–150).
Red background indicates the player did not retain his PGA Tour card for 2002 (finished outside the top 150).

Runners-up on the PGA Tour in 2001

See also
2000 PGA Tour Qualifying School graduates

References
Money list
Player profiles

Korn Ferry Tour
PGA Tour
Buy.com Tour Graduates
Buy.com Tour Graduates